Chattahoochee River National Recreation Area (CRNRA) preserves a series of sites between Atlanta and Lake Sidney Lanier along the Chattahoochee River in Georgia, U.S.  The 48-mile (77 km) stretch of the river affords public recreation opportunities and access to historic sites.  The national recreation area, a National Park Service unit, was established on August 15, 1978, by President Jimmy Carter.

The park headquarters and visitor center are located at the Island Ford Unit of the park, at 1978 Island Ford Parkway in Sandy Springs, Georgia. The Chattahoochee River is a stocked trout stream with 23 species of game fish. Year-round fishing is available with a Georgia fishing license and a trout stamp.

In 2012, the Chattahoochee National Recreation Area was designated as the Chattahoochee River Water Trail to become the first river named a National Water Trail. The National Water Trails System was created by the U.S. Department of the Interior to increase access to water-based outdoor recreation, encourage community stewardship of local waterways, and promote tourism.

Cochran Shoals is the largest and most popular unit of the park, featuring a  fitness trail, suitable for walking/jogging/biking, which is wheelchair-accessible and is excellent for bird- and wildlife-watching. The historic Marietta Paper Mill ruins along Sope Creek are preserved within the Sope Creek unit of the area. The Akers Mill ruins along Rottenwood Creek are found within the West Palisades unit. Steep rock cliffs rise from the river's flood plain in the East Palisades unit of the park.

Power's Island was named for James Power (1790–1870).  In 1835, he established Power's ferry on the Chattahoochee River, connecting what is now Sandy Springs to Cobb County.  Power's Ferry, now spelled Powers Ferry, was used by units of General William Sherman's army in July 1864.  The ferry was eventually replaced by a bridge, which was built in 1903.

The Vickery Creek unit preserves a rugged and scenic stretch of Vickery Creek (also known as Big Creek) from Grimes Bridge Road to its mouth at the Chattahoochee River.  The ruins of Ivy Mill, which was a wool mill that produced fabric for Confederate soldiers, are located in this unit along with the historic Allenbrook House.  Ivy Mill was destroyed by the Union Army in 1864, and the women factory workers were sent North for the duration of the war.  The Allenbrook House, completed in 1857, was the home and office of the manager of Ivy Mill.

From the Vickery Creek Unit, pedestrians can use sidewalks and spur trails for convenient access to Chattahoochee River Park (a Roswell Recreation and Parks/Fulton County park), Riverside Park, Don White Memorial Park, Willeo Creek Park on the Cobb County line, Waller Park on Hog Wallow Creek, and the Chattahoochee Nature Center.  Roswell Mill can be accessed via a spur trail and covered bridge that crosses the creek at the site of the Roswell Mill Machine Shop, which was built in 1853 and is the only original building left standing of the 1839 Roswell Manufacturing Company. The Roswell Mill building currently left standing was built in 1882 and is now used as an office complex.

The Chattahoochee River itself is one of Georgia's premier trout streams. It also offers picturesque areas for boating, canoeing, and rafting. It is very popular in  the summer months for visitors to rent tubes and float from Powers Island to Paces Mill.

Rangers enforce park regulations as well as Georgia criminal and traffic codes, and are authorized to carry firearms and make arrests.

In 2014, the CRNRA was given the Award for Outstanding Service to Environmental Education by the Georgia Environmental Education Association – an affiliate of the North American Association for Environmental Education.

Units

Bowmans Island
Settles Bridge
Orrs Ferry
Suwanee Creek
McGinnis Ferry
Medlock Bridge
Abbots Bridge
Jones Bridge
Holcomb Bridge
Island Ford
Vickery Creek
Gold Branch
Sope Creek
Johnson Ferry North
Johnson Ferry South
Cochran Shoals
Powers Island
East and West Palisades

References

 The National Parks: Index 2001-2003. Washington: U.S. Department of the Interior.

External links

 Chattahoochee River National Recreation Area at NPS.gov
 Chattahoochee River National Recreation Area: Hiking, Running & Walking Trails

 
Hiking trails in Georgia (U.S. state)
Roswell, Georgia
Duluth, Georgia
Sandy Springs, Georgia
Recreational fishing in the United States
National Park Service National Recreation Areas
National Park Service areas in Georgia (U.S. state)
Tourist attractions in Roswell, Georgia